The Milky Way has several smaller galaxies gravitationally bound to it, as part of the Milky Way subgroup, which is part of the local galaxy cluster, the Local Group.

There are 59 small galaxies confirmed to be within  of the Milky Way, but not all of them are necessarily in orbit, and some may themselves be in orbit of other satellite galaxies. The only ones visible to the naked eye are the Large and Small Magellanic Clouds, which have been observed since prehistory. Measurements with the Hubble Space Telescope in 2006 suggest the Magellanic Clouds may be moving too fast to be orbiting the Milky Way.

Characteristics
This is because of their interactions with the dense hot gas halo of the Milky Way that strip cold gas from the satellites. Satellites beyond that region still retain copious quantities of gas.

List
The Milky Way's satellite galaxies include the following:

Map with clickable regions

Streams

The Sagittarius Dwarf Spheroidal Galaxy is currently in the process of being consumed by the Milky Way and is expected to pass through it within the next 100 million years. The Sagittarius Stream is a stream of stars in polar orbit around the Milky Way leeched from the Sagittarius Dwarf. The Virgo Stellar Stream is a stream of stars that is believed to have once been an orbiting dwarf galaxy that has been completely distended by the Milky Way's gravity.

See also
 List of Andromeda's satellite galaxies
 List of nearest galaxies
 Local Group

Notes

References

Further reading 
 

Local Group